General Artigas is a town in the Itapúa Department of Paraguay.

It is named after the Uruguayan national hero, José Gervasio Artigas, who spent his last 30 years exiled in Paraguay (1820-1850).

Sister cities

General Artigas is twinned with:

 Fray Bentos, Uruguay

References

Sources 
World Gazeteer: Paraguay – World-Gazetteer.com

External links 
 

Districts of Itapúa Department
José Gervasio Artigas